{{Automatic taxobox
| image = Nycteris thebaica.jpg
| image_caption = Egyptian slit-faced bat (Nycteris thebaica)
| parent_authority = Hoeven, 1855
| taxon = Nycteris
| authority = G. Cuvier & E. Geoffroy Saint-Hilaire, 1795
| type_species = Vespertilio hispidus| type_species_authority = Schreber 1774
| subdivision_ranks = Species
| subdivision = *Nycteris argeNycteris auritaNycteris gambiensisNycteris grandisNycteris hispidaNycteris intermediaNycteris javanicaNycteris macrotisNycteris madagascariensisNycteris majorNycteris nanaNycteris parisiiNycteris thebaicaNycteris tragataNycteris vinsoniNycteris woodi}}Nycteris comprises a genus of bats commonly called slit-faced or hollow-faced bats. They are grouped in the family Nycteridae. The bats are found in East Malaysia, Indonesia, and many parts of Africa.

Description
The skull is distinguished by a characteristic interorbital concavity, externally connected to a long slit that runs down the centre of their faces from between the eyes to the nostrils, and probably assists in echolocation. They have large ears, and a complex nose-leaf. Their tails end in a T-shape, formed from cartilage, a unique feature among mammals. Their dental formula is: 

Nycterids have a reduction of the hand phalanges: the 2nd digit has only metacarpus, and the 3rd only two phalanges. The pectoral girdle has parallel features to birds. The sternum is strongly developed and the mesosternum has a keel.

Habitat and biology
Slit-faced bats inhabit rainforests and savanna, and roost in caves, trees, and buildings, typically in fairly small colonies. Some even roost in animal burrows, such as those of hedgehogs, aardvarks or porcupines. They eat insects, and some terrestrial invertebrates, such as spiders and small scorpions. At least one species, the large slit-faced bat, even catches vertebrate prey, such as frogs and small birds.

The echolocation calls of slit-faced bats are relatively quiet and short in duration, and they seem to target their prey by hearing the sounds it produces, rather than by sonar. They give birth once or twice each year.

Distribution
The genus Nycteris is found in the Afrotropics and the adjacent areas of Palaearctic, Madagascar and Oriental realms.

Classification
Most sources report 13 species. However, 16 have been described. Those of indeterminate status are marked with "?" in the list below.

Family Nycteridae
Genus NycterisBate's slit-faced bat, N. argeAndersen's slit-faced bat, N. auritaGambian slit-faced bat, N. gambiensisLarge slit-faced bat, N. grandisHairy slit-faced bat, N. hispidaN. h. hispidaN. h. pallidaIntermediate slit-faced bat, N. intermediaJavan slit-faced bat, N. javanicaLarge-eared slit-faced bat, N. macrotisN. m.aethiopicaN. m. macrotisN. m.luteolaMalagasy slit-faced bat, N. madagascariensisJa slit-faced bat, N. majorN. m. avakubiaN. m. majorDwarf slit-faced bat, N. nanaN. n.nanaN. n.tristisEgyptian slit-faced bat, N. thebaicaN. t. adanaN. t. albiventerN. t. capensisN. t. damarensisN. t. najdiyaN. t. thebaicaMalayan slit-faced bat, N. tragataParissi's slit-faced bat, N.  parisii ?
Vinson's slit-faced bat, N. vinsoniWood's slit-faced bat, N. woodiReferences

 Data from funet.ni
 IUCN 2006. 2006 IUCN Red List of Threatened Species. Downloaded on 13 April 2007.

Further reading
Abdullah MT. 2003. Biogeography and variation of Cynopterus brachyotis'' in Southeast Asia. PhD thesis. The University of Queensland, St Lucia, Australia.

Corbet, GB, Hill JE. 1992. The mammals of the Indomalayan region: a systematic review. Oxford University Press, Oxford.

Hall LS, Gordon G. Grigg, Craig Moritz, Besar Ketol, Isa Sait, Wahab Marni and M.T. Abdullah. 2004. Biogeography of fruit bats in Southeast Asia. Sarawak Museum Journal LX(81):191-284.

Karim, C., A.A. Tuen and M.T. Abdullah. 2004. Mammals. Sarawak Museum Journal Special
Issue No. 6. 80: 221—234.

Mohd. Azlan J., Ibnu Maryanto, Agus P. Kartono and M.T. Abdullah. 2003 Diversity, Relative
Abundance and Conservation of Chiropterans in Kayan Mentarang National Park, East
Kalimantan, Indonesia. Sarawak Museum Journal 79: 251-265.

Hall LS, Richards GC, Abdullah MT. 2002. The bats of Niah National Park, Sarawak. Sarawak Museum Journal. 78: 255-282.

Wilson DE, Reeder DM. 2005. Mammal species of the world. Smithsonian Institution Press, Washington DC.

 
Taxa named by Georges Cuvier
Taxa named by Étienne Geoffroy Saint-Hilaire